Chikkarayapuram Comes Under Mangadu Municipality in chennai metropolitan area in the Indian state of Tamil Nadu. Mangadu Pincode-6000122 and Chikkarayapuram Pincode-600069

Demographics
 India census, Sikkarayapuram had a population of 5807. Males constitute 53% of the population and females 47%. Sikkarayapuram has an average literacy rate of 55%, lower than the national average of 59.5%: male literacy is 62%, and female literacy is 48%. In Sikkarayapuram, 15% of the population is under 6 years of age.

References

Cities and towns in Kanchipuram district